Siphonodon is a small genus of flowering plants in the family Celastraceae.

Species
The Catalogue of Life lists six species:
 Siphonodon annamensis
 Siphonodon australis 
 Siphonodon celastrineus 
 Siphonodon membranaceus
 Siphonodon peltatus
 Siphonodon pendulum

References

 
Celastrales genera
Taxonomy articles created by Polbot